Ida Elin Friman (born 26 December 1999) is a Swedish bandy player, currently playing with Villa Lidköping BK in the women's Elitserien. She has played with the Swedish women's national bandy team.

Playing career 
Friman is from Surte and her mother club was Surte BK; she played at youth level for Surte/Kareby BK/IS. She joined Villa Lidköping BK in 2018.

International play 
Friman made her international debut in January 2017, at age 17, appearing in a pair of training matches against Finland and scoring twice in each match.

She also represented Sweden in the women's bandy tournament at the 2019 Universiade in Krasnoyarsk, Russia. Friman scored a goal in the gold medal match to help Sweden defeat Russia and claim top honours in the tournament.

Personal life 
Friman studies civil engineering and architecture at Chalmers University of Technology in Göteborg; for the 2019–20 school year, she was awarded one of 75 annual scholarships for students who have represented Sweden in international sport. Her father, Jonny Friman, played for Surte BK, and her brother, Gustav, and sister, Moa, also play for Elitserien teams.

References 

Living people
1999 births
Sweden international bandy players
Sportspeople from Västra Götaland County
Villa Lidköping BK players
Surte BK players
Universiade gold medalists for Sweden
Universiade medalists in bandy